Matthew Chadwick (born 12 Jul 1990) is a horse racing jockey in Hong Kong. He was champion apprentice in 2008/09. He ranked fourth in the jockeys' premiership in 2009/10 although he became a fully fledged jockey in mid season. By the end of 2010/11, Chadwick had had 134 wins. 

 He notched his 250th win in Hong Kong with Majestic Anthem on 26 December 2013 and rode his first Hong Kong four-timer at Sha Tin on 22 June, 2014.

Significant horses
Egyptian Ra
California Memory

Performance

References

The Hong Kong Jockey Club

Living people
Hong Kong jockeys
1990 births